Mats Lundahl, born on 11 May 1946, is a Swedish economist, and a tenured professor at the Stockholm School of Economics.

His specialties are foreign aid and development economics.

References

External links
 Bibliography

Swedish economists
1946 births
Living people
Place of birth missing (living people)